Jacob Fry Jr. (June 10, 1802 – November 28, 1866) was a Jacksonian and Democratic member of the U.S. House of Representatives from Pennsylvania.

Biography
Jacob Fry Jr. was born in Trappe, Pennsylvania.  He taught school in Trappe, and served as clerk of courts of Montgomery County, Pennsylvania, from 1830 to 1833.

Fry was elected as a Jacksonian to the Twenty-fourth Congress and reelected as a Democrat to the Twenty-fifth Congress.  He was not a candidate for renomination in 1838.  He engaged in mercantile business in Trappe and was elected as a member of the Pennsylvania House of Representatives in 1853 and 1854.  He served as auditor general of Pennsylvania from 1857 to 1860.  He resumed mercantile pursuits and died in Trappe in 1866.  Interment in Augustus Lutheran Church Cemetery.

Sources

The Political Graveyard

1802 births
1866 deaths
People from Trappe, Pennsylvania
American Lutherans
Democratic Party members of the Pennsylvania House of Representatives
Pennsylvania Auditors General
Jacksonian members of the United States House of Representatives from Pennsylvania
Democratic Party members of the United States House of Representatives from Pennsylvania
19th-century American politicians